St. Francis High School is a Catholic college preparatory high school for boys, located in La Cañada Flintridge, California, USA.  Founded in 1946 on the lands bought from the Flintridge Country Club, it is owned and directed by the Capuchin Friars of the Western American Province of Our Lady of Angels.  It is located in the Archdiocese of Los Angeles.

Academics
In 2012, St. Francis placed first in California and second nationally in the Academic Decathlon.

Demographics
The demographic breakdown for the 675 boys enrolled in 2013-2014 was:

Native American/Alaskan - 0.4%
Asian/Pacific islander - 9.2%
Black - 9%
Hispanic - 23.3%
White - 50.8%
Multiracial - 14.2%

Athletics 
The St. Francis Golden Knights compete in the Mission League, part of the CIF Southern Section.  The school colors are brown and gold.  The following varsity sports are offered:

Basketball
Baseball
Cross country
Football
Golf
Lacrosse
Soccer
Swimming
Tennis
Track
Volleyball
Water polo

1982- CIF Champions CFU
2020 - Basketball Southern California State Champions (Coach: Todd Wolfson)
2021 - CIF Champions Lacrosse (Coach: Don Bowers)

Notable alumni
 Christian Bergman, MLB pitcher
Greg Dulcich, NFL football player
Jason Hirsh, MLB pitcher
Mark Loretta, MLB second baseman
Lloyd Monserratt, California political & community leader
Mike Newlin, NBA player
Tony O'Dell, actor
Daniel Paladini (2003), Major League Soccer midfielder
Peter Vagenas, soccer player
Carl Verheyen, musician
Mike Vitar, actor
Matt Young, baseball player
Gregg Zaun, MLB catcher

Notable faculty
Michael Tucci, actor-turned-theatre coach

References

External links

School homepage

Boys' schools in California
Roman Catholic secondary schools in Los Angeles County, California
Capuchin schools
La Cañada Flintridge, California
Educational institutions established in 1946
1946 establishments in California
Catholic secondary schools in California